Susan E. Connolly is an Irish fiction and non-fiction writer who has worked in comics, screenwriting, short fiction and novels. In March 2021, Connolly was announced to be attached as the lead writer of Zom-B, a television series adaptation of the novel series of the same name by Darren Shan. In 2022, Connolly wrote two episodes of the six-part television crime drama Redemption.

Life and career
Connolly was born Susan Elizabeth Connolly in Ireland where she was educated and completed a degree in Veterinary Medicine and a diploma in Statistics at University College Dublin. She completed a PhD in  St John's College, University of Cambridge, in the Medical Research Council Biostatistics Unit.

While in UCD Connolly worked as the Science & Technology Editor as well as the Comment & Opinion Editor for The University Observer, the university's award-winning student newspaper. Her first novel, Damsel, was published by Mercier Press in 2009 under the pen name S.E.Connolly, while her historical comic book, Gráinne O’Malley: Queen’s Gambit, was published by Atomic Diner in 2015. Connolly was the winner of the BBC’s Scriptroom 7. She was selected for European Writers Club 2022 – Boosting Ideas. Connolly has also had work published by Clarkesworld, Strange Horizons and The Center For Digital Ethics.

Screenwriting
 Redemption (2022)

Bibliography
 Damsel (Mercier Press – 2009)
 Gráinne O’Malley: Queen’s Gambit (Atomic Diner – 2015)

References

External links
 

Irish women writers
Alumni of University College Dublin
Living people
Year of birth missing (living people)
Alumni of the University of Cambridge